Marwane Benamra (born 9 April 1995) is an Algerian professional footballer who plays for FC Swift Hesperange in Luxembourg.

References

Living people
1995 births
Association football forwards
Algerian footballers
Thonon Evian Grand Genève F.C. players
FC Villefranche Beaujolais players
USM El Harrach players
CR Belouizdad players
UD Horadada players
R.E. Virton players
Algerian Ligue Professionnelle 1 players
Championnat National 2 players
Championnat National 3 players
Luxembourg National Division players
Algerian expatriate footballers
Algerian expatriate sportspeople in Belgium
Algerian expatriate sportspeople in France
Algerian expatriate sportspeople in Spain
Expatriate footballers in Belgium
Expatriate footballers in France
Expatriate footballers in Luxembourg
Expatriate footballers in Spain
21st-century Algerian people